Custaloga, also known as Packanke, was a chief of the Delaware (Lenape) tribe in the mid-18th century. He was a member of the Wolf Clan through his mother. Captain Pipe was his nephew and succeeded him as chief.

Life
Little is known of the early life of Custaloga. He was born as Packanke into the Wolf Clan of his mother. The Delaware had a matrilineal kinship system, in which descent and hereditary leadership were passed through the mother's line. Children were born into the mother's clan and gained their social status there.

Custaloga, as he was documented by Indian agent George Croghan and other British colonists, settled in western Pennsylvania in the mid-18th century and built a sizeable village with his band at the confluence of French Creek and North Deer Creek in Mercer County, Pennsylvania. This town, known as "Custaloga's Town," became his principal seat. He also started another village known as Cussewago, along French Creek, at the present site of Meadville in Crawford County, Pennsylvania.

Custaloga's name first appeared in western Pennsylvania's history in George Washington's Journal of 1753. When the 21-year-old Washington arrived at Fort Machault in the village of Venango (present Franklin, Pennsylvania), Custaloga was in charge of the wampum of his nation under Chief Shingas.

Since Custaloga had aided Pontiac in his rebellion, the white settlers were wary of his actions. They asked Guyasuta of the Seneca to live among his people at Custaloga's Town to maintain a watchful eye on Chief Custaloga. The Seneca, one of the Six Nations of the Iroquois Confederacy, were powerful. By this time the Confederacy seemed to believe they had a kind of overlordship over the Delaware.

By late 1773 at a conference of Indian nations at Fort Pitt, the tribe was discussing the succession of the aging principal chief, Netawatwees, who died in 1776. George Croghan, sub-agent to Sir William Johnson, the Superintendent of Indian Relations, and Seneca representatives reported to Johnson about the debate. They wrote that Chief Custaloga was too old to replace Netwawatwees when that should become necessary.

In January 1774, during a conference of the Six Indian Nations of the Iroquois Confederacy at Johnson Hall near present-day Albany, New York, Croghan announced that Custaloga was to be succeeded as chief by his nephew Captain Pipe, a noted war leader.

On November 29, 1778, Colonel James Smith led an expedition from Fort Pitt to Custaloga's Town, but found it evacuated. After this date little is recorded about Custaloga. Some sources think he removed to Ohio, then perhaps returned to Kuskuskies' Indian Town, on the Shenango River (near New Castle, Pennsylvania). He may have died as early as 1775.

Legacy and honors
Custaloga was a name given to a railroad station at the junction of the Lorain, Ashland & Southern Railroad and Pennsylvania Railroad in Wayne County, Ohio (1897-1925).
A Boy Scout camp, Custaloga Town Scout Reservation, is named for him and located at the former site of Custaloga's village along French Creek in French Creek Township, Mercer County, Pennsylvania.

References

Wellenreuther, Hermann. "The Succession of Head Chiefs and the Delaware Culture of Consent: The Delaware Nation, David Zeisberger, and Modern Ethnography", In A. G. Roeber, ed., Ethnographies and Exchanges: Native Americans, Moravians, and Catholics in Early America. University Park, Pa.: Pennsylvania State University Press, 2008. 31–48.
Zeisberger, David; Hermann Wellenreuther and Carola Wessel, ed. The Moravian Mission Diaries of David Zeisberger. University Park, Pennsylvania: Pennsylvania State University Press, 2005. 

People of colonial Pennsylvania
Lenape people
Native American leaders
Indigenous people of Pontiac's War
Indigenous people of the French and Indian War
Native American people from Pennsylvania